Motapa Mine is a village in Matabeleland North, Zimbabwe and is located about 125 km north of Bulawayo in a gold mining area. The mining EPOs/ lease are owned by Duration Gold in the south, BilboesGold in the north and Metallon  Group in the center.

Populated places in Matabeleland North Province